Ajiboyede was a successful but autocratic alaafin of the Oyo empire during the sixteenth century. He succeeded Orompoto.

Events of reign
According to Oyo tales, the empire was attacked by the King of Nupe, Lajomo, during Ajiboyede's time in office. Originally, the battle was going in favor of the invaders until a bit of trickery and heroism by Ajanlapa, the Osi-wefa, changed the course and gave favor to the Oyos. To commemorate Ajanlapa's valor in war, the King created a special honor in the palace for Ajanlapa's son. The son was given a full-time and rare permission to be a guest in the palace of the Alaafin and to take the stead in place of the king at some occasions. Unfortunately, this honor required that he had to become a eunuch, as this was the tradition for high court offices. Ajiboyede thought it would be ungrateful to have Ajanlapa's son castrated, but his advisers strongly recommended the procedure. The King agreed and the boy was castrated.

Ajiboyede is credited with starting the three-year festival known as Bebe, to celebrate peace after the victory over the Nupes and to celebrate Ajiboyede's long reign. During the peaceful period, commerce and agriculture thrived, and the new capital of Igboho began to grow as a result of a favorable geographical location and population concentration. In the process, two major markets were established during his reign, and the city became a major trade route for acquiring horses from Hausaland.

Shortly after the Bebe festival began, Ajiboyede's firstborn son, the Arema Osemolu, died. Whilst Ajiboyede was mourning and fasting he reportedly had some chiefs visiting him executed for supposedly having eaten food, which nearly caused a rebellion.

Ajiboyede was succeeded by Abipa.

References

Samuel Johnson, Obadiah Johnson. The History of the Yorubas, From the Earliest of Times to the Beginning of the British Protectorate, p 162 - 163.

Alaafins of Oyo
Year of birth unknown
Year of death unknown